Jim Bicknell (12 September 1910 – 16 May 1991) was  a former Australian rules footballer who played with North Melbourne in the Victorian Football League (VFL).

Notes

External links 
		

1910 births
1991 deaths
Australian rules footballers from Victoria (Australia)
North Melbourne Football Club players